The 2022 Sefton Metropolitan Borough Council election took place on 5 May 2022 to elect members of Sefton Council. This was on the same day as other local elections. 21 of the 66 seats were up for election, with 1 ward (St. Oswald) being uncontested.

Background
From its creation in 1974 to the 1986 election, Sefton Council was under Conservative control. It was then under no overall control until the 2012 election, when Labour won their first majority on the council. In the 2021 election, Labour polled 46.6% and gained 6 seats, the Conservatives polled 26.0% for a gain of 2 seats, The Liberal Democrats took 14.1% and lost 5 seats, Formby Residents Action Group polled 2.2% and did not make any gains, and independents lost their 3 seats on the council.

The seats up for election this year were last elected in 2018. In that election, Labour gained 3 seats with 50.9% of the vote, the Liberal Democrats lost 4 seats on 16.0%, and the Conservatives gained 1 seat on 22.8%. Formby Residents Action Group lost the seat they were defending.

Previous council composition 

Changes:
 May 2021: Tony Carr leaves Labour to sit as an independent
 Andrew Wilson leaves Labour to sit as an independent

Results

Results by ward
An asterisk indicates an incumbent councillor.

Ainsdale

Birkdale

Blundellsands

Cambridge

Church

Derby

Duke's

Ford

Harington

Kew

Linacre

Litherland

Manor

Meols

Molyneux

Tony Carr was elected in 2018 for the Labour Party.

Netherton and Orrell

Norwood

Park

Ravenmeols

St. Oswald

This election was uncontested, so the poll was cancelled and Thomas was declared elected.

Sudell

Victoria

References

Sefton
Council elections in the Metropolitan Borough of Sefton